Forbin (D620) is a large anti-air frigate of the French Navy, lead ship of the . Her first task is protecting aircraft carriers, capital ships or civilian ships from supersonic missile attacks; her complement of medium-range anti-air missiles allows her to support the defences of another ship under attack and avoid their saturation. She is also capable of monitoring and controlling operations carried out from the sea by friendly aircraft. Forbin is the sixth vessel of the French Navy named after the 17th century admiral Claude Forbin-Gardanne.

Operations

Building and fitting out 
Construction of Forbin began in Lorient on 8 April 2002. The hull was built in 14 sections by a variety of subcontractors of DCN, including several companies from Saint-Nazaire. Forbin was laid down on 16 January 2004; the hull sections were transferred from Saint-Nazaire to Lorient on a barge tugged by Alcyon and assembled there from February 2004 to January 2005, finishing with the bow. The engines were delivered by FiatAvio in September.

Forbin was launched on 10 March 2005, after part of the Scorff river was dredged to make it deep enough for her draught. She was towed out of her building dock by four tugboats at 16:15, taking advantage of the tide.  On 28 October, Forbin entered dry dock and underwater equipment was installed, notably the sonar, propellers and rudders.

Trials were held throughout 2006. Engine tests started on 10 May, and she sailed for sea trials on 29 June. Tuning of the combat management systems was particularly problematic, setting the completion of the ship off-schedule enough for her commissioning to be delayed by several months.  In late January 2007, Forbin underwent new extensive trials at sea, successfully testing her combat systems in exercises against Super Étendard and Atlantique 2 aircraft.  The PAAMS was tested in late May at the Centre d'Essais des Landes.  From 12 to 17, Forbin sailed to Toulon, her new home port, where her combat, detection and weapon systems were further finetuned. Forbin fired an Aster 30 at the test range of the DGA on 25 November.

First cruise 
Forbin left Toulon on 3 March 2009 for her first long cruise, visiting Morocco, the United States and Canada. She carried a Panther from Squadron 36F of the Aéronavale to validate her air installations. Forbin sailed to Casablanca, and then to Rio de Janeiro. She left Brazil on 30 March, bound for Martinique, where she arrived on 21 April. and sailed on to Norfolk, Virginia and New York, arriving on 24 April. A visit to Halifax was cancelled. Forbin was back to France in May, where she took part in the naval parade of 8 May off Sainte-Maxime. On 25 May, she was at Abu Dhabi. In June, Forbin operated with the  carrier group, supporting "Operation Enduring Freedom" and maritime security operations.

Second cruise
The frigate Forbin was part of the French naval task group led by the aircraft carrier  that departed Toulon on 30 October 2010 for a four-month deployment to the  Mediterranean Sea, Red Sea, Indian Ocean. and Persian Gulf.  The task group commander, Rear Admiral Jean-Louis Kerignard, defined force's mission as follows:

The force would help allied navies fight piracy off the coast of Somalia and send jets to support NATO in the skies above Afghanistan.

Once on station, the Charles de Gaulle carrier task group joined two U.S. Navy carrier strike groups led by the  aircraft carriers  and  operating in the Persian Gulf. Subsequently, between 7–14 January 2011, the French carrier task group led by Charles de Gaulle participated with bilateral naval exercise, code named Varuna 10, with the Indian Navy. Varuna 10 was a two-phase naval exercise, with the harbor phase taking place between 7–11 January and the sea phase between 11–14 January in the Arabian Sea.

POLARIS 21
Forbin participated in the French-led POLARIS 21 exercise.

CLEMENCEAU 22
Forbin deployed as part of Clemenceau 22 led by the carrier .

Gallery

See also 
 List of ship launches in 2005

References

External links 
 Frigate Forbin Forbin on Alabordache 
 Netmarine.net Photographs of the construction and the launching 

Frigates of France
Horizon-class frigates of the French Navy
2005 ships
Ships built in France